The Mexican redleg or red-legged tarantula (Brachypelma emilia) is a species of terrestrial tarantula closely related to the famous Mexican redknee tarantula.  Like the redknee it is a docile tarantula and popular in the pet trade.  It is slow growing and, like many tarantulas, females can live for decades.

Description
The Mexican redleg, also known as the red-legged tarantula, has a dark-colored body with the second joint of its legs being pink, red or orange.  Its carapace is light colored with a distinctive black triangle at the front.  Following moulting, the colors are more pronounced.

An adult female has a body roughly 65 mm long, with a legspan of 12.5 cm, and a weight of approximately 15 to 16 grams.

White described it as follows:

Conservation
All species of Brachypelma were placed on CITES Appendix II in 1994, thus restricting trade. Nevertheless, large numbers of tarantulas caught in the wild continue to be smuggled out of Mexico, including species of Brachypelma.  (However, the trade in B. emilia largely involves captive-bred spiderlings.)

In Mexico, the species is listed as "threatened".

Distribution 
This species is found in  the foothills of the Sierra Madre Occidental in Sinaloa and Nayarit in Mexico.

In captivity
The Mexican redleg is a mostly docile species, perhaps more so even than the redknee. That, coupled with its coloration, and impressive size, makes it a very popular pet species. As such it is considered to be threatened by capture for sale to the pet trade.

It is very reluctant to bite when distressed, but possesses urticating hair and will flick these if it feels threatened.

Taxonomy 
It was first described in 1856 by Scottish zoologist Adam White as Mygale Emilia, but in 1891 Eugene Simon transferred it to the new genus, Brachypelma, making B .emilia the type species.

References

Theraphosidae
Endemic spiders of Mexico
Spiders described in 1856
Taxa named by Adam White (zoologist)
Fauna of the Sierra Madre Occidental